Aïda Mbodj is a Senegalese politician, a Deputy and a Cabinet Minister, as well as Vice-President of the National Assembly of Senegal.

Biography
During the first government of Macky Sall (from April 21, 2004 to November 23, 2006), she was Minister of Women, the Family and Social Development. She also held a cabinet post during the second government of Macky Sall (from November 23, 2006 to June 19, 2007), this time with a larger cabinet portfolio, as Minister of Women, the Family, Social Development and Women's Entrepreneurship.

To the disappointment of her supporters, she was not kept on in the government of Cheikh Hadjibou Soumaré who named Awa Ndiaye to the post in June 2007.

Mbodj made her political comeback in 2011, recently being named to the cabinet of current President Abdoulaye Wade's government as Minister of State, the Family and Women's Organizations. She was a supporter of efforts by Abdoulaye Wade to amend the Constitution to enable to continue in office for another term. Large protests organized by both supporters and opponents of Wade took place during the Summer of 2011.

References

See also

Articles
Senegal
Women in Senegal

1955 births
Living people
Members of the National Assembly (Senegal)
Family ministers of Senegal
Women's ministers of Senegal
21st-century Senegalese women politicians
21st-century Senegalese politicians
People from Diourbel Region
Women government ministers of Senegal